Qaemabad (also Romanized as Qā’emābād and Qa’emābād; also known as Qa’emābād Shāh Yūrdī, Shahivardi, Shāh Vardī, Shāhverdī, Shāhyowrdī, and Shāh Yūrdī) is a village in Yeylaq Rural District, in the Central District of Buin va Miandasht County, Isfahan Province, Iran. At the 2006 census, its population was 1,186, in 226 families.

References 

Populated places in Buin va Miandasht County